The Superior Court of California, County of Lake, also known as the Lake County Superior Court or  Lake Superior Court, is the branch of the California superior court with jurisdiction over Lake County.

History
Lake County was partitioned from Napa and Mendocino counties in 1861.

The court house was destroyed by a suspected arson on the night of February 15, 1867, and all the county records were lost in the fire, except for one of the Treasurer's books. With the destruction of the court house, the county seat was temporarily moved to Lower Lake; after it returned to Lakeport in 1870, preparations were made for a new permanent court house. Early county judges included O.A. Munn (1861–63), J.B. Holloway (1864–71), and E.M. Paul (1872–79); after the new California constitution established the Superior Court system, judges included R.J Hudson (1880–89), R.W. Crump (1890–1903; died in office), and M.S. Sayre (1903;1904–14).

 
The contract for the new court house was let to A.P. Pettit on May 27, 1870, for $17,000 and it was completed in 1871. It received a coat of cement in March 1906, and withstood the 1906 San Francisco earthquake one month later. The 1871 courthouse was added to the list of California Historical Landmarks as No. 897; it also was added to the National Register of Historic Places in 1970.

The current courthouse was completed in 1968 behind the 1871 courthouse and dedicated on September 13; the old courthouse was turned into a museum for county and Native American history. The 1968 courthouse is a three-storey structure with brick archways on each face, designed by James Prather and Robert W. Stevens.

Venues

In addition to the main courthouse in Lakeport, a satellite court operates in the county's largest city, Clearlake.

References

External links
 
 

Superior Court
Superior courts in California